The 2011 California wildfires were a series of wildfires that were active in the state of California during the year 2011. In total, there were 7,989 fires that burned  of land.

Fires 
Below is a list of all fires that exceeded  during the 2011 fire season. The list is, and all data herein, is taken from CAL FIRE's list of large fires, except where otherwise cited.

References

 
California, 2011
Wildfires in California by year